The first season of the Fairy Tail anime series was directed by Shinji Ishihira and produced by A-1 Pictures and Satelight. It follows the first adventures of Natsu Dragneel and Lucy Heartfilia of the fictional guild Fairy Tail. The season adapts the first 16 volumes of Hiro Mashima's Fairy Tail manga series. Natsu befriends Lucy who joins the titular guild and later goes on missions with her to earn money along with fellow wizards Gray Fullbuster and Erza Scarlet, as well as Natsu's flying cat, Happy. The five go on a forbidden S-Class mission with Gray and Erza to save Galuna Island and fight Gray's rival Lyon Vastia. Shortly after, the guildhall is attacked by their rival guild Phantom Lord, leading into a guild war. After the dissolution of Phantom Lord, the group learns of Erza's past as a slave in the Tower of Heaven and confront Jellal Fernandez to destroy the tower. Lastly, once back at Fairy Tail, Natsu and the others face Laxus Dreyar and the Raijin Tribe as they stage a coup in Fairy Tail.

The season initially ran from October 12, 2009 to September 27, 2010 on TV Tokyo in Japan. It was later released on DVD in 12 compilations, each containing four episodes, by Pony Canyon between January 29 and December 24, 2010. Crunchyroll streamed the whole season's episode subtitled in English for free on its website. The season's episodes were streamed as a simulcast, only one hour after they aired on TV Tokyo in Japan. The season was licensed by Animax Asia for a Southeast Asian broadcast. Their adaptation aired from September 30, 2010 to December 6, 2011. DVDs of their adaptations were not released. In 2011, Funimation Entertainment licensed the series for an English DVD release in North America. The season was released in four compilations between November 22, 2011 and March 20, 2012. The series also began airing on the Funimation Channel in North America beginning on November 22, 2011.

The season makes use of eight pieces of theme music: four opening themes and four ending themes. The opening themes are "Snow Fairy", performed by Funkist for episodes 1 to 11,  by Idoling!!! for episodes 12 to 24, "Ft." performed by Funkist for episodes 25 to 35, and "R.P.G. (Rockin' Playing Game)" performed by Sug for the remainder of the season.


Episode list

Notes

References

General

Specific

1
2009 Japanese television seasons
2010 Japanese television seasons